John Waller may refer to:

Politicians
John Waller (Virginia politician) (1673–1754), American politician in Virginia
John Gough Waller, Australian politician
John L. Waller (1850–1907), African-American lawyer, politician, journalist, publisher, businessman, military leader and diplomat
John Waller (Wycombe MP), British Member of Parliament for Wycombe
John Waller (County Limerick MP), Member of the UK Parliament County Limerick and Parliament of Ireland for Limerick County
John Waller (Doneraile MP), Member of the Parliament of Ireland for Doneraile

Others
John Waller (perjurer) (died 1732), stoned to death in pillory
John Francis Waller (1809–1894), Irish poet and editor
Red Waller (1883–1915), Major League Baseball pitcher
Sir John Waller, 7th Baronet (1917–1995), English author, poet and journalist
John Waller (Baptist) (1741–1802), Virginia preacher (a/k/a "Swearing Jack" Waller), see Elijah Craig
John Waller (bishop) (1924–2015), bishop of Stafford
John Waller (musician) (born 1970), American Contemporary Christian musician and singer-songwriter
John H. Waller (CIA official) (1923–2004), Inspector General of the Central Intelligence Agency
John H. Waller (judge) (born 1937), South Carolina judge
John Waller (cricketer) (1824–1886), English cricketer
John Waller (fight director) (1940-2018), English historical European martial arts (HEMA) revival pioneer and fight director